Riwon Airport is an airport in Riwŏn-gun, Hamgyong-namdo, North Korea.

Facilities 
The airfield has a single asphalt runway 11/29 measuring 8150 x 128 feet (2484 x 39 m).  It has a full-length parallel taxiway with aprons at each end, as well as taxiways leading nearly 1.5 km north to dispersed or underground aircraft storage.  It is home to a fighter regiment of 38 MiG-21 jets.

The majority of aircraft located here tend to be a mass of J-5

References 

Airports in North Korea
South Hamgyong